Mae Na Wang is a tambon (subdistrict) of Mae Ai District, in Chiang Mai Province, Thailand. In 2020 it had a total population of 15,118 people.

Administration

Central administration
The tambon is subdivided into 17 administrative villages (muban).

Local administration
The whole area of the subdistrict is covered by the subdistrict administrative organization (SAO) Mae Na Wang (องค์การบริหารส่วนตำบลแม่นาวาง).

References

External links
Thaitambon.com on Mae Na Wang

Tambon of Chiang Mai province
Populated places in Chiang Mai province